Brian Patrick Victor Pezzutti,  (born 6 January 1947) is a former Australian politician and Australian Army officer. Born in Casino, New South Wales, he was the son of Victor Dominic Pezzutti and Helena Hilda Bazzo. He was an army reservist in 1965 and later became active in the armed forces; he received the National Medal in 1978. On 23 February 1976 he married Christine Jillian Spence, with whom he has two daughters and two sons.

Pezzutti was trained as a medical practitioner and is a specialist anaesthetist. He joined the Liberal Party and was the foundation president of the Lismore Branch, serving from 1983 until 1990. He has been vice-president since this time. In 1988, he was elected to the New South Wales Legislative Council, on which he served until his retirement in 2003. While an MLC, he served in the Gulf War (1991), Bougainville (1995, 1998) and East Timor (1999). He was also Brigadier Assistant Surgeon General of the Australian Defence Forces from 2000 to 2004.

Honours and awards

Additional awards:
 New South Wales Government Meritorious Award for Tsunami Assistance (2005)
 Paul Harris Fellow – Rotary International (2006)

References

1947 births
Living people
Military personnel from New South Wales
Australian brigadiers
Australian military personnel of the International Force for East Timor
Members of the New South Wales Legislative Council
Liberal Party of Australia members of the Parliament of New South Wales
Recipients of the Conspicuous Service Cross (Australia)
Recipients of the Centenary Medal
Australian politicians of Italian descent
21st-century Australian politicians
20th-century Australian politicians